HOSH (born as Holger Behn in Hamburg, Germany) is a German DJ & producer. He is a part of the record label Diynamic and founder of fryhide imprint (or in German 'Freiheit').

Career 

HOSH got into production because he wanted to know how the records he was playing were put together. HOSH says “When it comes to producing, making music for me is like cooking – the meal / track gets better the more love you put in.” Back in 2006, with his flatmate at that time Solomun & Stimming, HOSH was the first member of Diynamic, releasing successful records such as Oelckersallee EP & White Elephant. Following releases and remixes for imprints like Kindisch, Get Physical, Stil Vor Talent, Supernature, Freerange, Strictly Rhythm, Dessous, Tsuba and more. Being a vital part of the Diynamic crew, HOSH released his album in 2010 on Diynamic 'Connecting The Dots'  an album made up of ten dance floor cuts which all exhibit a trademark Diynamic musicality; hint at HOSH influences up to this point and simultaneously mark out a path into the future of underground house music. HOSH broke into the music charts in 2010 with his EP Cash the Chord. Since, he's continued to remain a staple of Diynamic, playing pretty much weekly at Sankeys Ibiza for Neon Nights.

Fast forwarding to 2013, HOSH presented a special consisting of four releases, eight tracks on Diynamic calling it 'Forever Young' - HOSH says "We all had our dreams when we were young. It's never too late to live them. This is basically what this special series is all about." Making highlights again, HOSH stepped up for the official remix of Sono's 'Keep Control' released in 2013 on Kontor Music. The release was a staple in Beatports top 100. HOSH then ended his Diynamic journey with his latest release 'Karma EP' in 2017 - becoming the #1 track in Beatport techno charts in 2017. Summer 2016, HOSH was invited by Heart Ibiza to host five exclusive dates with ROULETTE - boasting a unique audio and visual concept, the focus of the party was that of a futuristic roulette wheel. Inviting alongside him DJ pals, including Patrice Baumel, Matthias Meyer and many more. HOSH says “Heart is a place on the island that really wants to be groundbreaking and always looks for fresh concepts—I feel our ROULETTE idea has found the perfect home,” he tells DJ Mag Ibiza. “If you come to one of our five events this year, you will find something that you don't find at any other party on the island!” 
 
HOSH established his own imprint fryhide. Which was initiated with the 'Stories From Sa Talaia' album, creating a mix that HOSH gave away as a free download for his fans. Then releasing the tracks through 4 EP's on fryhide featuring collaborations with GHEIST, Tim Engelhardt, Lehar, Pig&Dan, Karmon, Mia Lee, Sono, Musumeci & Johannes Brecht. fryhide since has seen great success releasing music from artists such as Artbat, Tone Depth, Groj, 1979 and more - Becoming one of the best selling labels and holding high chart positions in Beatport top 100 all genres and Melodic House & Techno. Moving forward HOSH has taken fryhide to his fans through showcases in Montreal, Basel, Berlin, Amsterdam, Hamburg & Barcelona. Starting 2018, HOSH was nominated for the Melodic House & Techno DJ Awards alongside artists such as Solomun, Tale Of Us, Maceo Plex & more.

Midnight (The Hanging Tree) 

In 2019, HOSH teamed up with Italian newcomer 1979 ( Venetian-born, Amsterdam based producer Giovanni Salviato) on a dance version of James Newton Howard's Hunger Games's song The Hanging Tree. Now entitled Midnight (The Hanging Tree) and featuring singer Jalja, the song reached #1 on the Melodic House and Techno Tracks playlist after being released exclusively on Beatport in December 2019. In 2020 the record was signed to Mark Gillespie and Pete Tong's Three Six Zero Recordings, with the UK release being promoted by Sony's Ministry of Sound records label. The track was then picked up by BBC Radio 1's Annie Mac as ‘The Week's Hottest Record’ and was also Pete Tong's Essential New Tune, the first of the decade. After a couple of months hanging around the bottom of the Official Singles Chart Top 100, the song finally entered the Top 40 on 26 June 2020 at Number 34. Since its January 2020 release, "Midnight (Hanging Tree)" has seen undeniable global success, accumulating well over 23 million streams on Spotify and over 40 million on all platforms.  The single was embraced on the international DJ circuit, receiving of notable remix duties from MK and Henrik Schwarz in June 2019.

Becky Hill and Sigala - Heaven On My Mind (HOSH Remix) 

Released in August 2020, HOSH has been recruited by UK pop-dance rising Becky Hill & Sigala to remix their summer single.

Discography

Albums 
 2010: Connecting.The.Dots (Diynamic)

Extended plays and singles 
 2006: "Süßstoff" (Stil Vor Talent)
 2006: Solomun and HOSH - Oelkersallee EP (Diynamic)
 2007: Solomun / HOSH - Mischwaren EP (Diynamic)
 2007: Themes, Rhythms & Harmonies / Jazzkantine (Diynamic)
 2007: "Grünanlage" (Stil Vor Talent)
 2007: "White Elephant" (Kindisch)
 2008: Under a Fig Tree EP (Diynamic)
 2008: Stimming / HOSH / Solomun - Trilogy EP (Diynamic)
 2008: Remix Session 01 (Diynamic)
 2009: Better & Sweet EP (Diynamic)
 2010: Cash the Chord EP (Diynamic)
 2011: The Remix Sessions 07 (Diynamic)
 2011: "Tour De Fonque" (Leena Music)
 2012: Ego EP (Poker Flat Recordings)
 2012: Neon EP (Diynamic)
 2012: Life Is Music Is Life EP (Diynamic)
 2012: HOSH & HearThug - "Technicolour" (Stranjjur)
 2013: HOSH Presents Forever Young 2 (Diynamic)
 2013: HOSH Presents Forever Young (10 INCH) (Diynamic)
 2013: HOSH Presents Forever Young 3 (Diynamic)
 2014: Forever Young 4 (Diynamic)
 2015: Cilantrophy EP (Diynamic)
 2016: "Lunchtime" (Bedrock Records)
 2017: Karma EP (Diynamic)
 2017: Stories from Sa Talaia - fryhide
 2018: On the radar - fryhide
 2018: Blinded - fryhide
 2018: Jedi - fryhide
 2018: Unconventional Ride - fryhide
 2018: Express / Airwolf - fryhide
 2019: Solstice - fryhide
 2019: Midnight - fryhide
 2020: Tighter featuring Jalja

Remixes 
 2007 Dizko Toaster - Toast Hawaii (H.O.S.H. Remix) - Stil Vor Talent
 2007 Smith and Burns - Come On Digital (H.O.S.H. Remix) - Deepdub Recordings
 2007 Catorze - Lusco fusco (H.O.S.H. Remix) - Bloop Recordings
 2008 Koletzki - Music from the heart (H.O.S.H. Remix) - Stil vor Talent
 2008 Lucy - Downstairs (H.O.S.H. Remix) - Meerestief
 2008 Sweno N- Lore - Ziodoor (H.O.S.H. Remix) - Parquet
 2008 Daso - Bummelzug (H.O.S.H. Remix) - Flash
 2008 Milton Jackson - Ghosts (H.O.S.H. Remix) - Freerange
 2008 Nicone - Una Rosa (H.O.S.H. Remix) - Stil vor Talent
 2009 Lucy - Downstairs (H.O.S.H. Remix) - Meerestief Digital
 2009 Milton Jackson - Ghosts In My Machine (H.O.S.H. Remix) - Freerange
 2009 Sole Fusion - Bass Tone (H.O.S.H. Remix) - Strictly Rhythm
 2010 Alex Moments and Matt Brown - Odette (H.O.S.H. Remix) - Supernature
 2010 Trickski - Pill Collins (H.O.S.H. Remix) - Suol
 2011 Gorge - Makena (H.O.S.H. Remix) - 8bit Records
 2011 Audiojack - No Rest For The Wicked (H.O.S.H. Remix) - Gruuv
 2011 Moonbeam - No Regrets (H.O.S.H. Remix) - Neurotraxx Deluxe
 2011 Adultnapper - Idiot Fair (H.O.S.H. Remix) - Pokerflat
 2012 Rivera Rotation - Singing Our Song (H.O.S.H. Remix) - Lounge Records
 2013 HNQO featuring BR - We Do It (H.O.S.H. Remix) - Playperview
 2013 Sono - Keep Control (H.O.S.H. Remix) - Kontor Records
 2013 Marlon Hoffstadt and HRRSN - Skin And Bone (H.O.S.H. Remix) - Stil vor Talent
 2013 Riva Star featuring Rssll - Detox Blues (H.O.S.H. Remix) - Snatch! Records
 2015 ABBY – Halo (H.O.S.H.'s Boy Remix) - 2DIY4
 2015 ABBY – Halo (H.O.S.H.’s Night Remix) - 2DIY4
 2015 Kaiserdisco – Jet Stream (H.O.S.H. Remix) – KD RAW
 2015 Kaiserdisco – Jet Stream (H.O.S.H.’s Melodrama Mix) – KD RAW
 2015 Of The Moon – Of The Moon (feat. Bartlee) (H.O.S.H. Remix) – Audiotonic Records
 2016 Andre Winter, D-SAW - Track 10:30 (H.O.S.H. Remix) - Capital Heaven
 2016 RÜFÜS - Innerbloom (H.O.S.H. Remix) - Sweat It Out!
 2017 Simon Berry, Luke Brancaccio - Oblivion (HOSH Remix) – Bedrock Records
 2018 Desert Sound Colony - Sunrise Of My Mind (HOSH Remix) – Fayer
 2018 Groj - The Crossing (HOSH Remix) – fryhide
 2018 Hernan Cattaneo, Lonya - Confession EP (HOSH & Tone Depth Remix) – Warung Recordings
 2018 Tone Depth, Fetsum, Johannes Brecht - Free (HOSH Edit) – Diyanamic Music
 2019 Poe - Through Glass (HOSH edit) - fryhide
 2019 Simao - The Chase (HOSH edit) - fryhide
 2019 Joplyn - Money Machine (HOSH remix) - Stone Free Berlin
 2019 Crooked Colours - I C Light (HOSH remix) - fryhide
 2020: Boss Doms - I Want More (feat. Kyle Pearce) [HOSH remix] - Warner Music Italy
 2020: Becky Hill and Sigala - Heaven On My Mind (HOSH Remix) - Universal

References 

 

Living people
German DJs
Year of birth missing (living people)
Electronic dance music DJs